Webb is a city in Clay County, Iowa, United States. The population was 138 in the 2020 census, a decline from 165 in 2000.

Geography
Webb's longitude and latitude coordinatesin decimal form are 42.948134, -95.012281.

Demographics

2010 census
As of the census of 2010, there were 313 people, 63 households, and 40 families living in the city. The racial makeup of the city was 99.3% White and 0.7% African American.

There were 63 households, of which 23.8% had children under the age of 18 living with them, 52.4% were married couples living together, 3.2% had a female householder with no husband present, 7.9% had a male householder with no wife present, and 36.5% were non-families. 31.7% of all households were made up of individuals, and 15.9% had someone living alone who was 65 years of age or older. The average household size was 2.24 and the average family size was 2.83.

The median age in the city was 43.5 years. 22.7% of residents were under the age of 18; 6.5% were between the ages of 18 and 24; 22.8% were from 25 to 44; 26.2% were from 45 to 64; and 22% were 65 years of age or older. The gender makeup of the city was 52.5% male and 47.5% female.

2000 census
As of the census of 2000, there were 165 people, 73 households, and 44 families living in the city. The racial makeup of the city was 99.39% White and 0.61% Native American. Hispanic or Latino of any race were 0.61% of the population.

There were 73 households, out of which 26.0% had children under the age of 18 living with them, 50.7% were married couples living together, 4.1% had a female householder with no husband present, and 38.4% were non-families. 34.2% of all households were made up of individuals, and 20.5% had someone living alone who was 65 years of age or older. The average household size was 2.26 and the average family size was 2.84.

In the city, the population was spread out, with 25.5% under the age of 18, 4.2% from 18 to 24, 24.2% from 25 to 44, 23.6% from 45 to 64, and 22.4% who were 65 years of age or older. The median age was 42 years. For every 100 females, there were 96.4 males. For every 100 females age 18 and over, there were 86.4 males.

The median income for a household in the city was $27,500, and the median income for a family was $31,500. Males had a median income of $30,000 versus $21,528 for females. The per capita income for the city was $13,087. About 10.4% of families and 9.8% of the population were below the poverty line, including 18.8% of those under the age of eighteen and none of those 65 or over.

Education
Sioux Central Community School District serves the community.

Webb was previously a part of the South Clay Community School District; on July 1, 2010, the district was dissolved, with portions going to Sioux Central.

References

External links

http://cityofwebb.com/
City-Data Comprehensive statistical data and more about Webb

Cities in Clay County, Iowa
Cities in Iowa